Charles Townshend (1725–1767) was a British Chancellor of the Exchequer.

Charles Townshend may also refer to:
Charles Fox Townshend (1795–1817), founder of the Eton Society
Charles Townshend, 3rd Viscount Townshend (1700–1764), father of the Chancellor
Charles Townshend, 2nd Viscount Townshend (1674–1738), known as Turnip Townshend, grandfather of the Chancellor
Lord Charles Townshend (1769–1796), son of the 1st Marquess Townshend, British MP for Great Yarmouth
Lord Charles Townshend (1785–1853), son of the 2nd Marquess Townshend, British MP for Tamworth
Sir Charles Townshend (British Army officer) (1861–1924), British Army officer and politician
Charles Townshend (historian) (born 1945), British historian
Charles Townshend, 1st Baron Bayning (1728–1810), British politician, cousin of the Chancellor
Charles Townshend, 2nd Baron Bayning (1785–1823), British peer and Tory Member of Parliament
Charles Townshend, 8th Marquess Townshend (born 1945)
Sir Charles James Townshend (1844–1924), judge and Chief Justice of Nova Scotia, MP for Cumberland

See also
Charles Townsend (disambiguation)